Árpád Szarvas is a musician, best known as the lead singer, songwriter, lyricist, guitarist of EZ Basic.

Early life and personal life
Szarvas is from Szabadka and lived in Szeged, Hungary, however, he moved to the capital city, Budapest after graduating at Faculty of Arts and Humanities at the University of Szeged to pursue a music career.

EZ Basic

Szarvas played guitar in Pale Blue Eyes, a Szeged-based noise rock band while attending the secondary school. The band played music influenced by Nick Cave and the Bad Seeds, Sonic Youth, and Joy Division. However, he left the band and formed EZ Basic with his friend Dénes Pesztalics. Szarvas was influenced by bands such as The Jesus and Mary Chain, House of Love, Primal Scream, and Broadcast. He is the founding member of EZ Basic.
Apart from EZ Basic, he also released music under the name Evil Men Have No Songs and Models Can't Fuck.

Discography
With EZ Basic:
Albums and EPs
 EZ To Say EP (2007)
 Hocus Focus (2007)
 Hello Heavy (2010)
 Memories of Spring EP (2012)
 Dead End Darling (2015)
 Sissyfuzz (2017)

With Evil Men Have No Songs:
Albums and EPs
 Evil Men Have No Songs EP (2010)
 Always Somewhere Else EP (2012)
 Where We Come From EP (2013)

With Models Can't Fuck:
Albums and EPs
 Move To Iceland EP (2011)
 Models Can't Fuck EP (2017)

Singles
 Ghost Kid (2010, with Models Can't Fuck)
 Home Tonight (2010, with Evil Men Have No Songs)
 Move To Iceland (Möbel remix) (2012, with Models Can't Fuck)
 New Lines (2013, with EZ Basic)
 Unnatural (2014, with EZ Basic)
 Whatcha Gonna Do With Your Life? (2015, with EZ Basic)

Instruments

Guitars
Epiphone 5102T / EA-250

Amplifiers
Orange

Effect pedals 
Boss DS-1
Boss CH2
Electro-Harmonix Small clone

See also
EZ Basic

References

External links
 Szarvas on Discogs

Living people
Hungarian indie rock musicians
Year of birth missing (living people)